Estonia competed at the 2018 European Athletics Championships in Berlin, Germany, from 6–12 August 2018. A delegation of 22 athletes were sent to represent the country.

Medalists

Results
 Men 
 Track and road

Field events

Combined events – Decathlon

Women
Field events

Combined events – Heptathlon

References

European Athletics Championships
2018
Nations at the 2018 European Athletics Championships